Ziar Mahalleh (also Romanized as Zīār Maḩalleh) is a village in Siyahrud Rural District, in the Central District of Juybar County, Mazandaran Province, Iran. At the 2006 census, its population was 313, in 82 families.

References 

Populated places in Juybar County